Sakhawat Memorial Govt. Girls' High School is a school located at Lord Sinha Road, Kolkata, India.

About School

This is a girls' school and is affiliated to the West Bengal Board of Secondary Education for Madhyamik Pariksha (10th Board exams), and to the West Bengal Council of Higher Secondary Education for Higher Secondary Examination. The school was established in 1911 by Begum Rokeya. Smt. Papia Nag (née Singha Mahapatra), Siksharatna recipient and  a National Award winner teacher, is the present headmistress of the school.

See also
Education in India
List of schools in India
Education in West Bengal

References

External links 
 

High schools and secondary schools in West Bengal
Girls' schools in Kolkata
Educational institutions established in 1911
1911 establishments in India